Collegiate Press Service (CPS) is currently the name of a commercial news agency supplying stories to student newspapers. Earlier organizations (now defunct) used the same or similar names in the past.

History of Earlier Organizations 
The first organization named Collegiate Press Service began as the news agency of the United States Student Press Association (USSPA). CPS was originally based in Washington, D.C. In the mid-1960s, two radical staff members of CPS were purged from the USSPA and established Liberation News Service (LNS).

When USSPA suffered financial setbacks in the early 1970s (eventually going defunct by  1971), CPS was spun off and became a progressive alternative news collective in Denver, Colorado.

This iteration of the CPS later folded, as well, selling its name to the commercial enterprise, and distributing funds from the sale to progressive groups in Denver.

Notable staff members 
Political cartoonist Ed Stein was co-publisher of CPS during the period that it was based in Denver.

References

Notes

Sources 
 Berlet, Chip. 2011. “Muckraking Gadflies Buzz Reality,” In Ken Wachsberger, ed., Voices from the Underground: Insider Histories of the Vietnam Era Underground Press, Vol. 1, East Lansing, MI: Michigan State Univ. Press, pp. 267–297.
 McMillan, John Campbell. 2014. Smoking typewriters: the Sixties underground press and the rise of alternative media in America.
 Mungo, Raymond. 2012. Famous long ago: my life and hard times with Liberation News Service. Amherst: University of Massachusetts Press.
 Wachsberger, Ken. 2012. Voices from the underground: Insider histories of the Vietnam era underground press. Tempe, Ariz: Mica's Press.

News agencies based in the United States
Student newspapers